A list of films produced in Brazil in 2001 (see 2001 in film). Brazil produced 30 films in 2001.

2001

See also
2001 in Brazil
2001 in Brazilian television

References

2001
Films
Brazil